Hans Stolfus (born in Solon, Iowa) is a male beach volleyball player from the United States, who won the silver medal in the men's beach team competition at the 2007 Pan American Games in Rio de Janeiro, Brazil, partnering Ty Loomis.

External links
 
 Hans Stolfus at the Association of Volleyball Professionals (archived)

1976 births
Living people
American men's beach volleyball players
Beach volleyball players at the 2007 Pan American Games
People from Solon, Iowa
University of Hawaiʻi alumni
San Diego State University alumni
Pan American Games silver medalists for the United States
Pan American Games medalists in volleyball
Medalists at the 2007 Pan American Games